Kälberloch is a World Cup downhill ski course in Austria, located on Gamskogel (Radstadt Tauern) mountain in Zauchensee, Altenmarkt im Pongau, Salzburg; it debuted in 1990.

Kälberloch is considered the most demanding course on the women's World Cup circuit; it hosted the season final speed events for men and women in March 2002, with the technical events on the "Griessenkar" course.

The start fall is so steep (70% gradient) it is impossible to walk uphill; the only access to the start at ridge overhang with barely any space, is via a steep cog railway.

World Cup

Women

Men

Course sections 
 Startschuss, Gamsfeld, Schikane, Hot Air, Jägersprung, Kälberloch, Wasserschloss, Kompression, Panoramakurve, Unterbergweg, Lecherneck, Schmalzleiten, Tischboden, Ziel Sprung

References

External links
altenmarkt-zauchensee.at official site
FIS Alpine Ski World Cup – Zauchensee, Austria 
Ski-db.com - Zauchensee women's races

Ski areas in Austria